This is a list of British Army Garrisons

A garrison town is typically a group of multiple camps grouped around one central town, that often highly depends on the military presence; however sometimes they are just the aggregation of all military units stationed within a larger city (in the case of London, Edinburgh, York, Cheshire, and Merseyside).

Current

United Kingdom 
Aldershot Garrison
Bicester Garrison
Bovington Garrison
Bovington Camp
Lulworth Camp
Allenby Barracks, Wareham
Catterick Garrison
Cheshire Garrison
Colchester Garrison
Edinburgh Garrison – Garrison commander is the Governor of Edinburgh Castle
Larkhill Garrison
London Central Garrison
Merseyside Garrison
Tidworth, Netheravon and Bulford Garrison
Tidworth Camp
Perham Down Camp
Bulford Camp
Netheravon Station
Warminster Garrison
Battlesbury Barracks
Waterloo Lines
Harman Lines
Winchester Garrison
Sir John Moore Barracks
Worthy Down Camp
York Garrison – commanding officer of 2 Signal Regiment doubles as York Garrison commander
York Station
Strensall Station

Overseas 

Brunei Garrison
Dhekelia Garrison
Episkopi Garrison

Former

Germany
 Bergen-Hohne Garrison – downsized in 2013 to Bergen and Hohne Camps, closed in 2015
 Hohne Camp
 Fallingbostel Station
 Celle Station
 Bergen-Hohne Training Area
 Gütersloh Garrison – merged with Paderborn Garrison in 2014 to form Westfalen Garrison
 Paderborn Station (closed in 2016)
 Sennelager Station – Normandy Barracks still in use
 Hameln Station (closed in 2014)
 Gütersloh Station (closed in 2019)
 Herford Station (closed in 2015)
 Osnabrück Garrison
 Osnabrück Station
 Münster Station
 Paderborn Garrison – merged with Gütersloh Garrison in 2014 to form Westfalen Garrison
 Paderborn Station
 Rhine Garrison – downsized in 2013/14 to Rhine Station, closed in 2015
 Westfalen Garrison – formed in 2014 through merger of Paderborn and Gütersloh Garrisons
 Herford Station (closed in 2015)
 Paderborn Station (closed in 2016)
 Sennelager Station – Normandy Barracks still in use
 Gütersloh Station (closed in 2019)

References

Bibliography

 

Garrisons